Karolin Thomas (born 3 April 1985 in Lichtenberg, Berlin) is a German football midfielder. She currently plays for 1. FFC Frankfurt, and has been capped once for the German national team. After the 2010 season she stopped playing football due to injuries.

External links
DFB profile

1985 births
Living people
German women's footballers
Germany women's international footballers
1. FFC Turbine Potsdam players
Footballers from Berlin
1. FFC Frankfurt players
People from East Berlin
Women's association football midfielders
20th-century German women